Hep-Me Records is a Mississippi based blues and zydeco record label.  It is affiliated with Mardi Gras Records and was run by music industry veteran Senator Jones prior to his death in 2008.

See also
 List of record labels

References

American record labels
Blues record labels
Folk record labels